Tao Kae Noi is a Thai crispy seaweed snack product. It was founded by Itthipat Peeradechapan in 2004.

Taokaenoi Food & Marketing PLC. (SET: TKN) is a food company, manufacturer and distributor of crispy seaweed snack. The company has three food and beverage business operations: snacks, restaurants, and seasoning powder. It produces fried, grilled, baked, crispy, roasted, and tempura seaweeds; souvenirs, roll farm products, corn snacks, mini breads, corns, fruits, and potato sticks.

Awards

Certificates awarded to the Company
 CODEX GMP from Global Certification Service by the Food and Drug administration
 Ministry of Public Health of Thailand
 Codex GMP from U.K.
 Certificate of HACCPGMP
 ISO9001: 2008 from SGS
 Halal by the Central of Islamic of Thailand
 Thailand Trusted Quality

References

Food and drink companies of Thailand
Food and drink companies established in 2004
2004 establishments in Thailand